Norman "Nooi" Girigorie is a Curaçao professional manager.

Career
In 1992, he helped to train Netherlands Antilles national football team. In 2012, he worked as assistant of head coach of the Curaçao national football team. In 2014, he coached the CSD Barber. Since 28 January until 1 March 2015 he was a head coach of the Curaçao national football team.

Honours

Club
CSD Barber
 Sekshon Pagá: 2014

References

External links

Year of birth missing (living people)
Living people
Dutch Antillean football managers
Curaçao football managers
Curaçao national football team managers
Sekshon Pagá managers
Place of birth missing (living people)